Adelpherupa is a genus of moths of the family Crambidae.

Species
Adelpherupa aethiopicalis Maes, 2002
Adelpherupa albescens Hampson, 1919
Adelpherupa costipunctalis Maes, 2002
Adelpherupa elongalis Maes, 2002
Adelpherupa flavescens Hampson, 1919
Adelpherupa lialuiensis Maes, 2002
Adelpherupa pontica Maes, 2002
Adelpherupa terreus (Zeller, 1877)
Adelpherupa typicota (Meyrick, 1933)

References

Schoenobiinae
Crambidae genera
Taxa named by George Hampson